Svava Rós Guðmundsdóttir (born 11 November 1995) is an Icelandic footballer, who has represented the Iceland women's national football team on numerous occasions. At club level, she currently plays for US National Women's Soccer League club NJ/NY Gotham FC.

Club career
Svava Rós started her senior playing career in the summer of 2011 with Icelandic team Valur, making her debut in a match against Breiðablik, aged 15. Two years later, in 2013, she signed a two-year contract with Valur. Prior to the  season, Svava Rós transferred to Breiðablik, winning the league in her first season with the club. Svava Rós had the most assists in the 2016 and 2017 Úrvalsdeild kvenna championships.

In 2018, Svava Rós signed for Norwegian Toppserien team Røa IL. During the 2018 Toppserien season, Svava Rós scored 14 goals in 21 matches, and was named in the Team of the Year. In November 2018, Svava Rós signed for Swedish team Kristianstads DFF for the 2019 Damallsvenskan season.

In January 2021, Svava Rós joined French club FC Girondins de Bordeaux. She left the club in December 2021, and in February 2022, she signed for Norwegian club SK Brann. She was part of the Brann team that won the 2022 Toppserien. 
In January 2023, Svava Rós joined US National Women's Soccer League club NJ/NY Gotham FC.

International career
Svava Rós made six appearances for Iceland U17, scoring once in a match against Austria U17. She also played nine matches for Iceland U19, scoring three times. Svava Rós scored her first senior goal for Iceland in a 2019 Algarve Cup match against Portugal women's national football team, in which Iceland won 4–1.

International goals

References

External links
 
 

1995 births
Living people
Svava Ros Gudmundsdottir
Women's association football forwards
Svava Ros Gudmundsdottir
Røa IL players
Toppserien players
Kristianstads DFF players
Damallsvenskan players
FC Girondins de Bordeaux (women) players
SK Brann Kvinner players
Icelandic expatriate sportspeople in Norway
Icelandic expatriate sportspeople in Sweden
Icelandic expatriate sportspeople in France
Icelandic expatriate footballers
Expatriate women's footballers in France
Expatriate women's footballers in Norway
Expatriate women's footballers in Sweden
UEFA Women's Euro 2022 players
Expatriate women's soccer players in the United States
Icelandic expatriate sportspeople in the United States